Brawl is a real-time card game designed by James Ernest and released in 1999 by Cheapass Games.

Gameplay
Like Spit or Icehouse, players in Brawl do not take turns, instead either making a move or staying inactive as best suits their strategy at that moment.  The game is fast-paced (games typically last a minute or two) but still has a fairly high level of strategy.

Each player has a different deck of cards.  The object of the game is to win the most Base-cards by playing the most Hit-cards onto each Base before a Freeze-card is played on it. The game ends when a Freeze has been played on every Base in play. A player wins a Base-card if she has more Hits on her side of the Base than her opponent has on his side. If both players have the same number of Hits on the Base, the owner of the Base-card wins the Base.

Cards
This is a full list of all Brawl card-types published 2006, with applicable rules and other details:

Cards That Are Not "Base-Modifiers"

Base
At the beginning of the game, each player places one Base on the field.

During the play, a Base is played either to the left or the right of Bases already in play. There can never be more than three Bases in play at the same time.

A Base is considered to have two sides, one for each player, on which one can play Hit-cards

Hit
Hits come in three basic colours:  Blue, Red and Green.

A Hit can be played on either side of a Base that does not already have a Hit-card. A Hit can also be played onto a Hit of the same colour.

The Kasanova deck introduced a unique Wild Hit, which can be played on any Hit, but not on a Base or a Press. Also, any Hit or Block can be played on a Wild Hit.

Hit-2
Follows exactly the same rules as an ordinary Hit, except that it cannot be played on a Base or a Press. Also, when determining the winner of a Base, a Hit-2 counts as two Hits.

Block
Blocks come in the same colours as Hits.

A Block can be played on a Hit of the same colour.

The Ting Ting deck introduced a unique Wild Block, which can be played on any Hit.

Clear
A Clear can be played on a Base, after which that Base and all cards played on it are moved to the side of the field. This Base is no longer in play.

If there is only one Base in play, you can not play Clear on it. Also, if there are three Bases in play, you can not play Clear on the one in the middle.

Press
A Press can be played either on a Base, a Base-Modifier or a Block.

If played on a Block, a Hit can subsequently be played on the Press. This Hit must be the same colour as the Hit under the Block.

If played on a Base or a Base Modifier, it nullifies the effect of every Base-Modifier (if any) underneath it.

Freeze
Every deck has three Freezes.  They are placed at the bottom of the deck after the cards are shuffled but before play begins.

A Freeze can be played on a Base. After that, no more cards can be played on that Base, or on any other card connected to it.

"Base-Modifiers"
Base-Modifiers were first introduced by the Club Foglio Set (they are not found in the six originally-published decks). A Base-Modifier is played on a Base, another Base-Modifier or a Press played on any of the previous two kinds of cards.

Hold
If no other card has been played on a Hold, it prevents a Clear from being played on that Base.
Only found in the Club Foglio -decks.

Null
When counting won bases at the end of the game, the base under this card counts towards neither player;
Only found in the Club Foglio -decks.

Reverse
When counting hits towards winning a Base, odd number Reverses switches the owner of both sides.

Double
When counting won bases at the end of the game, this Base counts as double the number of bases for each Double on it.
First introduced in the Catfight Set

Decks
The original set consisted of 6 decks:
Bennett
Chris
Darwin
Hale
Morgan
Pearl

As of 2006, four sets of expansions are available for the game:
Catfight Set
Nickie
Sonia
Tamiya
Club Foglio Set
Alex
Crane
Gina
Mischo
Rent
Tess
Ting-Ting
Kasanova

In 2001, Brawl: Club Foglio won the Origins Awards for Best Card Game Expansion or Supplement 2000 and Best Graphic Presentation of a Card Game 2000.

In 2005, the French company Eclipse Vis Comica published the six original decks in French (though the cards were in English), and added a new promotional deck, Natacha which was available only with the proof of purchase of all 6 standard decks. These decks were all 44 cards instead of the original 35 cards, and included new rules, including "customization" options. For this edition, the name of the game was changed to Fight, and the characters were all replaced with more flashy, anime-style characters.

In November 2011, the California company Brode Games released the original six decks on iPhone and iPad.  BRAWL briefly made the top 25 free card games list on the App Store.

Reviews
Pyramid

References

External links

Kasanova deck, an unreleased licensed Brawl deck
Brawl Spoilers, a quick-reference table for the recipe of each of the decks for Brawl
BRAWL on the App Store, available free for iPhone and iPad.

Card games introduced in 1999
Cheapass Games games
Dedicated deck card games
Origins Award winners